Barry Horne (born 18 May 1962) is a Welsh former professional footballer, former chairman of the Professional Footballers' Association and sports television pundit.

As a player, he was a midfielder from 1984 until 2002, notably playing in the Premier League for Everton. He also played in the Football League for Wrexham, Portsmouth, Southampton, Birmingham City, Huddersfield Town, Sheffield Wednesday, Walsall and Kidderminster Harriers before playing in Non League for Belper Town. He was capped 59 times by Wales, scoring twice.

Since retirement Horne has worked as the chairman of the PFA, as well as mixing sports punditry with a role as Director of Football at Wrexham.

Playing career
In his career Horne played for Wrexham, Portsmouth, Southampton, Everton, Birmingham, Huddersfield (where he scored once against Bristol City), Sheffield Wednesday, Kidderminster Harriers (where he scored on his debut against Torquay United), Walsall and Belper Town.

While at Wrexham, he was responsible for one of the most memorable moments in the club's history, a vital away goal in a 4–3 defeat against Porto in the first round of the European Cup-Winners' Cup in October 1984. Wrexham had won the first leg 1–0, and Horne's 89th-minute strike ensured that they progressed to the second round of the competition, where they lost to Roma.

He captained the Welsh national team and won the FA Cup in 1995 whilst playing for Everton.

His Welsh senior debut came on 9 September 1987, aged 25, in a 1–0 win over Denmark in a Euro 88 qualifier at Cardiff Arms Park. The last of his 59 caps for Wales came a decade later on 29 March 1997 in a 2–1 home win over Belgium in a World Cup qualifier, also at Cardiff Arms Park.

His most successful spell as a player was at Everton between 1992 and 1996. Horne's most famous goal in an Everton shirt came on the final day of the 1993–94 season against Wimbledon. Everton had to win to survive relegation. Horne's goal, a 30-yard screamer, levelled the scores at 2–2. Graham Stuart would go on to score the winning goal to secure Everton's Premiership status. It was the only goal Horne had scored in the FA Carling Premiership that season. Soon after he won Everton's Footballer of the Year 1995 award. At the start of the previous season, he had the distinction of scoring Everton's first Premier League goal, a 44th-minute equaliser in a 1–1 draw at home to Sheffield Wednesday. The other goal Horne scored for Everton came against his former club Southampton in February 1996 (a 2–2 draw).

As a player, Horne was known for being a "midfield ball-winner" with a ferocious tackle.

Director of football
In November 2011, Horne returned to professional football when on a volunteer basis he became a director at Wrexham Football Club – the club that gave him in his first opportunity in professional football – when Wrexham Supporters Trust became the first ever Supporters Trust to take over a professional football club as a going concern. He was Director of Football at the Racecourse for almost five years, until he stepped down in October 2016.

Media career
He is on a football related chat show on Merseyside radio station Radio City 96.7. He has also done punditry work on Match of the Day, and sometimes does commentary and punditry work for Sky Sports. Horne also writes a football column in the Liverpool Echo newspaper.

The Welsh supporters' brass band are named The Barry Horns in homage to the footballer.

Personal life
Horne has a first-class degree in chemistry from the University of Liverpool. As of 2014, he was director of football and teacher of chemistry and physics at The King's School, Chester. He was appointed to the board of directors of Wrexham Football Club after the club was taken over by its Supporters Trust in November 2011.

Career statistics

Honours
Southampton
Full Members Cup finalist: 1992

Everton
 FA Cup: 1995
 FA Charity Shield: 1995

References

External links
Profile at Everton fansite www.toffeeweb.com
2nd profile at www.toffeeweb.com

1962 births
Living people
Sportspeople from St Asaph
Welsh footballers
Wales international footballers
Association football midfielders
Everton F.C. players
Wrexham A.F.C. players
Portsmouth F.C. players
Southampton F.C. players
Birmingham City F.C. players
Huddersfield Town A.F.C. players
Sheffield Wednesday F.C. players
Kidderminster Harriers F.C. players
Walsall F.C. players
Premier League players
English Football League players
Flint Town United F.C. players
Alumni of the University of Liverpool
FA Cup Final players